Magical Space-Time is a 2016 Chinese television series directed by Fu-Hsiang Hsu (許富翔). Filming for the series started on 20 January 2016 in Beijing and ended on 27 March 2016. It first aired in China on the Hunan Broadcasting System (HBS) on 27 April 2016.

Plot
The story follows Han Ruofei (Jia Nailiang), who underwent plastic surgery and a change of name following an explosion of the yacht he was in. He managed to obtain a time-traveling polaroid which was a gift from his wife who was already dead. By taking a selfie, it allows him to travel back in time to the same place 10 years ago. However, the time-traveling machine has limitations too. He cannot travel as many times as he wants, the maximum time for each travel is 10 minutes, and he can only travel back to exactly the same place 10 years ago. Determined to save his deceased wife, Xie Jiaxin (Ruby Lin), an actress, and also uncover the cause of his mother's death, he sets off on his time-traveling journey.

There in the past, conflicts happen between Ruofei, his wife, and his past self, Peng Zhendong (Kim Sungjoo). At the same time, he meets an energetic girl named Song Qiaoqiao (Xu Lu), who is a huge fan of his wife. Various misunderstandings, collisions, and mischiefs occur between the two. Later, as the two gradually develop a deep understanding for each other, Song Qiaoqiao started to develop a feeling for him. Through the many times of time-traveling, he rewrites history and managed to bring his wife back to life in the present. He uncovers the real truth behind the death of his mother and the downhill of their family business.

Cast
 Ruby Lin as Xie Jiaxin , ex-wife of Peng Zhendong , rising diva actress , She was supposed to be dead before Han Ruofei change the timeline from ten year ago which alter her fate. 
Jia Nailiang as Han Ruofei , Present day Peng Zhendong who underwent plastic surgery and a change of name following an explosion of the yacht ten year ago. Became a time traveler by using  time-traveling polaroid which was a gift from his wife. 
Xu Lu as Song Qiaoqiao ,  Huge fan of Xie Jiaxin who Han Ruofei befriends.
Kim Sung-joo as Peng Zhendong, Past self of Han Ruofei before  plastic surgery ten years ago. He was presumed decreased/missing after the explosion of the yacht ten year ago
Wang Yu as Du Kai , Manager of Xie Jiaxin and Han Ruofei's love rival.
Wu Yang as Xu Qiao
Li Qiang as Pan Zhiyong
Hu Ling Meng as Lola
Xiong Xiao Wen as Zheng Mei Ying

Music
 Opening Theme : "Wǒ Yǐ Wéi" (我以为; I Love You So) sung by Alex Chou
 Ending theme : "Xìng Fú Tài Duǎn" (幸福太短; Fleeting Happiness) sung by A-Lin
 Theme Song  : "Xiǎng Huí Dào Nà Yì Tiān" (想回到那一天; Back to the Day) sung by Eric Chou

International broadcast

References

External links
 Official Weibo 
 Mango Official Page 

2016 Chinese television series debuts
2016 Chinese television series endings
Chinese romance television series
Chinese time travel television series
Television series set in the 2010s
Television shows set in Beijing
Hunan Television dramas
Television series by Mango Studios